Ross Devenish (born 15 November 1939) is a South African film director. His 1980 film Marigolds in August was entered into the 30th Berlin International Film Festival, where it won the Berlin Bear Anniversary Prize.  His 1977 feature film The Guest won a Bronze Leopard at Locarno International Film Festival.

Ross also directed the eight-part adaptation of Bleak House which won three BAFTAs.  Now that the Buffalo's Gone won a Blue Riband Award.  He was one of the two directors engaged on Goal! about the World Cup Competition being held in England in 1966.  Goal! received the Robert Flaherty Award from BAFTA.

Personal
Ross Devenish studied film-making in London.  He started his career with documentaries, filming behind the Royalist lines in the Civil War in the Yemen, secretly entering and filming the mercenaries trapped in the besieged town of Bukava in the Congo after a failed coup, and the next year filming in Vietnam during the 1968 Tet Offensive.  He then spent the best part of a year in the United States making a film about the Native Americans, called Now that the Buffalo's Gone.

Deciding to concentrate on his interest in drama, he began working with the dramatist Athol Fugard.  He directed three films with scripts by Fugard, including The Guest and Marigolds in August, in his native South Africa.  The Guest  won a Bronze Leopard at Locarno and Marigolds in August a Silver Bear in Berlin.

He currently lives in Cape Town.

Selected filmography

Films
 Calling the Shots (TV film) (1993 )
 Marigolds in August (1980)
 A Chip of Glass Ruby (1983)
 The Guest: An episode in the Life of Eugène Marais (1977)
 Boesman and Lena (1973)

Television
 Dalziel and Pascoe (TV Series) (3 episodes) ( 1996-2001)
 Secrets of the Dead (2001)
 Exit Lines (1997)
 A Clubbable Woman (1996)
 A Certain Justice (TV series) ( 1998 )
 The Bill (TV series) (2 episodes) ( 1997)
 Mid-Life Crisis (1997)
 Do Unto Others (1997)
 True Tilda (TV series) ( 1997)
 A Touch of Frost (TV series) (1 episode) ( 1996 )
 Paying the Price (1996)
 Between the Lines (TV series) (2 episodes) ( 1994 )
 Free Trade (1994)
 Unknown Soldier (1994)
  1990–92 Agatha Christie: Poirot (TV series) (2 episodes) 
 One, Two, Buckle My Shoe (1992)
 The Mysterious Affair at Styles (1990)
 4 Play (TV series) (1 episode) ( 1990 )
 Madly in Love (1990)
 Screen Two (TV series) (1 episode) ( 1989 )
 Death of a Son (1989)
 The Happy Valley (TV film) ( 1987 )
 Screenplay (TV series) (1 episode) ( 1986 )
 Asinamali (1986)
 Masterpiece Theatre: Bleak House (TV mini-series) (2 episodes) ( 1985 ) 
 Great Performances (TV series) (1 episode) ( 1970 )
 This Week (TV series) (1 episode) (1970 ) 
 Do Something! (1970)
 Goal! The World Cup (documentary) (1967)
 Hide Hide Producer (1 credit)
 This Week (TV series) (producer - 1 episode) (1970 )
 Do Something! (1970) ... (producer)

References

External links

1939 births
Living people
South African film directors
Alumni of the London Film School